Good Dog, Carl is the eponymous name of the first of a series of children's picture books written and illustrated by Alexandra Day centering on a Rottweiler named Carl and a little girl named Madeleine, of whom he takes care.  All of the books  are mostly wordless, relying on the details of the illustrations to tell the stories. Good Dog, Carl was published in 1985 and has been continually in print since that date. There have been fourteen "Carl" titles after the first. All but the first have been published by Farrar, Straus and Giroux. The board book versions of these stories are particularly popular.  In addition to the children and Rottweiler fanciers who have enjoyed them, the books have been found useful in teaching English as a second language, with Alzheimer's patients, and with children who are having difficulty learning to read.

Other Carl Titles
Published by Farrar, Straus and Giroux:
Carl's Afternoon in the Park (1991)
Carl’s Christmas (1990)
Carl Goes Shopping (1989)
Carl’s Birthday (1995)
Carl’s Summer Vacation (2008)
Carl’s Snowy Afternoon (2009)
Carl and the Kitten (2011)
Carl and the Baby Duck (2011)
Carl and the Puppies (2011)
Carl at the Dog Show (2012)
Carl and the Sick Puppy (2012)
Carl’s Halloween (2015)
Published by Laughing Elephant Books:

 Goodnight, Good Dog Carl (2019)
 Good Dog Carl Visits the Zoo (2021)
 Good Dog Carl's Valentine (2021)

References

External links
 

American picture books
Series of children's books
Dogs in literature
Children's fiction books
1985 children's books